Muhammad: The Final Legacy or Qamar Bani Hashim is a 2008 historical Arab drama series directed by Mohammad Sheikh Najib, which is currently airing on Islam Channel weekly. It is the first drama series which has depicted the life of Muhammad mostly maintaining the Islamic traditions and depictional restrictions. Primarily its name was Qamar Bani Hashim and was aired on the month of Ramadan of 2008 on the LBC network. The series portrays the full life of Muhammad (c. 570-632) without depicting him and his caliphs, wives and children according to Islamic tradition.

In 2010, it was aired in Kanal 7 of Turkey titling Hz. Muhammed'in Hayatı dubbed in Turkish and in Ramadan 2011, it was aired in Geo tv of Pakistan titled Muhammad (S.A.W.) Sayyed-e-Qaunain Tamseel-e-Hayat-e-Tayyaba with Urdu dubbing. It was also released in Malaysia, as DVD with Malay subtitle.

Cast
Rashid Assaf as Hamza ibn Abdul-Muttalib
Bassem Yakhour as Abdul-Muttalib
Asaad Fedda as Umayyah ibn Khalaf
Najah Safkouney as Abu Sufyan ibn Harb
Taisir Idris as Abu Jahl ibn Hisham
Zoheir Ramadan as Abu Lahab ibn Abdul-Muttalib
Mahmoud Nasr as Zayd ibn Harithah
Ali Karim as Utbah ibn Rabi'ah
Yasir Abdullatif as Bilal ibn Rabah

See also
 List of Islamic films
 Muhammad in film

References

External links 
Official Website
 

2008 Lebanese television series debuts
Television series set in the 6th century
Television series set in the 7th century
Syrian historical television series
Television series about Islam
Arabic-language television shows
Cultural depictions of Muhammad
Films about Muhammad
2008 in Islam
2000s Lebanese television series
Lebanese Broadcasting Corporation International original programming